WCKS Kresy Tarnopol is a defunct Polish multi-sports club, which was located in Tarnopol, then in southeastern Poland; currently Ternopil, Ukraine. 

The had a football department which participated in regional leagues of the local Polish Football Association branch.

Kresy as a region and therefore the club too ceased to exist in September 1939, after German and Soviet aggression against Poland.

References

Association football clubs established in 1907
Association football clubs disestablished in 1939
1907 establishments in Austria-Hungary
1939 disestablishments in Poland
Defunct football clubs in Ukraine
Defunct football clubs in former Polish territories
Military association football clubs in Poland